Metachanda astrapias is a moth species in the oecophorine tribe Metachandini. It was described by Edward Meyrick in 1887. It is known from Mauritius, which is its type locality.

This species has a wingspan of 12mm for the male. Its head and palpi are whitish-ochreous, antennae dark fuscous. Thorax is whitish-ochreous, abdomen light grey, anal tuft whitish-ochreous. The forewings are elongated, narrow with a gently arched costa. They are fuscous with a pale greyish-ochreous median longitudinal streak from the base, margined beneath by a blackish streak and above by a cloudy blackish dot. The hindwings are grey, more thinly scaled towards the base.

References

Moths described in 1887
Oecophorinae
Moths of Mauritius
Endemic fauna of Mauritius
Taxa named by Edward Meyrick